Majed Al-Tamimi (born August 21, 1971) is a Saudi Arabian sport shooter. At the 2012 Summer Olympics he competed in the Men's skeet, finishing in 29th place with a total of 111 points.

References

Living people
Saudi Arabian male sport shooters
Olympic shooters of Saudi Arabia
Shooters at the 2012 Summer Olympics
Shooters at the 1994 Asian Games
Shooters at the 2002 Asian Games
Shooters at the 2006 Asian Games
Shooters at the 2010 Asian Games
Shooters at the 2014 Asian Games
1971 births
Asian Games competitors for Saudi Arabia
20th-century Saudi Arabian people
21st-century Saudi Arabian people